John Roberts Reading (November 1, 1826 – February 14, 1886) was a Democratic member of the U.S. House of Representatives from Pennsylvania.

John Roberts Reading was born in Somerton, Philadelphia, Pennsylvania.  He completed preparatory studies, and graduated from the Jefferson Medical College in Philadelphia, Pennsylvania, in 1847 and began practice in Somerton.  He later graduated from Hahnemann College in Philadelphia and practiced homeopathy.

Reading presented credentials as a Democratic Member-elect to the Forty-first Congress and served from March 4, 1869, to April 13, 1870, when he was succeeded by Caleb N. Taylor, who contested his election.  He was an unsuccessful Democratic candidate for election in 1870.  Died in Philadelphia in 1886.  Interment in the William Penn Cemetery in Somerton, Pennsylvania.

Sources

The Political Graveyard

External links

1826 births
1886 deaths
American homeopaths
Democratic Party members of the United States House of Representatives from Pennsylvania
Drexel University alumni
Politicians from Philadelphia

Thomas Jefferson University alumni
19th-century American politicians